Tioga Independent School District is a public school district based in Tioga, Texas (USA). It operates two schools: Tioga Elementary/Middle School and Tioga High School.

History
The district has one school that, from 1961 until the 2012-2013 school year, served students in grades Pre-Kindergarten through 8th grade. Students in grades nine through twelve attended Gunter High School in the Gunter Independent School District. This arrangement occurred since Tioga High School closed in 1961. At one time the district considered consolidating with another school district. Instead it opted to re-establish its high school.

However, beginning with the 2012-2013 school year, the District began its own high school, starting with the 9th grade and adding one grade each year until all 12 grades were served in the 2015-2016 school year.

In 2014 Tioga ISD had 392 students.

In 2009, the school district was rated "recognized" by the Texas Education Agency.

 the district has a single building for all grades. VLK Architects, a company in Fort Worth, Texas, is designing the building. In July 2016 the district voters approved a lease-purchase agreement to buy land for the high school. Groundbreaking occurred in December 2016.

The district changed to a four day school week in fall 2022.

Academics
The Texas Education Agency gave Tioga ISD the "Early College High School" designation, and it is the only school district in Grayson County to have this. The early college program began in 2015.

References

External links
 

School districts in Grayson County, Texas